Eaux d'artifice (1953) is a short experimental film by Kenneth Anger.

Summary
The film consists entirely of a woman dressed in eighteenth-century clothes who wanders amidst the garden fountains of the Villa d'Este ("a Hide and Seek in a night-time labyrinth") to the sounds of Vivaldi's "Four Seasons", until she steps into a fountain and momentarily disappears.

Production
The film was shot in the Villa d'Este in Tivoli, Italy. The actress, Carmilla Salvatorelli (not "Carmello"), was "a little midget" Anger had met through Federico Fellini. Anger used a short actress to suggest a different sense of scale, whereby the monuments seemed bigger (a technique he said was inspired by etchings of the gardens in the Villa d'Este by Giovanni Battista Piranesi).

Inspiration
The title, a play on words, is meant to suggest Feux d'artifice (Fireworks), in obvious reference to Anger's earlier 1947 work. Film critic Scott MacDonald has suggested that Fireworks was a film about the repression of (the film-maker's) homosexuality in the United States, whereas Eaux d'Artifice "suggests an explosion of pleasure and freedom."

Legacy
In 1993, this short film was selected for preservation in the United States National Film Registry by the Library of Congress as being "culturally, historically, or aesthetically significant".

See also 
 List of avant-garde films of the 1950s

References

External links 
 
 The entire film on Library of Congress official YouTube channel
 Eaux d’artifice essay by Daniel Eagan in America's Film Legacy: The Authoritative Guide to the Landmark Movies in the National Film Registry, A&C Black, 2010 , pages 481-482

1953 films
United States National Film Registry films
Films directed by Kenneth Anger
American avant-garde and experimental films
1950s avant-garde and experimental films
Films shot in Italy
1950s English-language films
1950s American films